Keiller MacKay Collegiate Institute (KMCI, Keiller MacKay) is a medium-sized public high school building located in Toronto's west end close to the intersection of Islington Avenue and Highway 401. Opened in 1971 until closing in 1983, it was overseen by the Etobicoke Board of Education, which was joined with other school boards in the Toronto area during the city's amalgamation to form what is now the Toronto District School Board.

History
KMCI, Etobicoke’s twentieth and final conventional high school, was constructed in 1970 and opened its doors in September 1971. This school, like most schools in Etobicoke, was design by Gordon Adamson and Associates Architects. Its architecture reminds one of a factory - specifically, there is a distinct lack of windows. 

The school experienced declining enrollment during the late 1970s and early 1980s as with other schools in Etobicoke area plummeted following a decision by the Ontario Government to extend funding of Catholic schools to include secondary school grades 10 to 13 (OAC) in the 1980s.

The Etobicoke Board of Education made a final decision to close KMCI in 1981-82 as the school property was sold to the Metropolitan Separate School Board (later the Toronto Catholic District School Board, and now houses Don Bosco Catholic Secondary School), and KMCI closed its doors for the last time at the end of the 1982-83 school year. All pupils were transferred to Martingrove Collegiate Institute. 

There was a need for a Catholic school. Don Bosco had already been running in the area in portables since its inception in 1978 and needed a school building. Keiller MacKay was chosen to be sold to the separate school board due to its declining enrolment.

The school was named after John Keiller MacKay, who served as the 19th Lieutenant Governor of Ontario from 1957 to 1963. The school colours were green and blue, and its mascot was a Saber-toothed cat. The school's motto was Manu Forti (Strong Hand).

Don Bosco also met its similar fate thirty-four years later, by closing its doors at the end of the 2016-17 school year. As of August 2017, the building is home to the Toronto Argonauts practice facility.

The Keiller Mackay Room is currently located in the TDSB's West Education Office, the former headquarters of the EBE.

Principals
KMCI had only 2 Principals through the 12 years it was open.  John McNeil was principal for 9 years, starting in 1971. Gordon Fleming was Principal for the final 3 years.

See also
List of high schools in Ontario

References

External links

High schools in Toronto
Education in Etobicoke
Schools in the TDSB
Educational institutions established in 1971
1971 establishments in Ontario
Educational institutions disestablished in 1983
1983 disestablishments in Ontario
Defunct secondary schools
Defunct schools in Canada